A pseudo-octave, pseudooctave, or paradoxical octave in music is an interval whose frequency ratio is not 2:1 (2.3:1 or 1.9:1, for example), that of the octave,  but is perceived or treated as equivalent to this ratio, and whose pitches are considered equivalent to each other as with octave equivalency.

Stretched octave
The stretched octave, for example 2.01:1, sounds out of tune when played with true harmonic overtones, but in tune when played with tones whose overtones are stretched equivalently.

In piano tuning, stretched octaves are commonly encountered, where the inharmonicity caused by string thickness and tension makes it necessary to widen every interval very slightly. See: stretched tuning.

The octaves of Balinese gamelans are never tuned 2:1, but instead are stretched or compressed in a consistent manner throughout the range of each individual gamelan, due to the physical characteristics of their instruments.  Another example is the tritave  of the Bohlen–Pierce scale (3:1).

Octave stretching is less apparent on large pianos which have longer strings and hence less curvature for a given displacement; that is one reason why orchestras go to the expense of using very long concert grand pianos rather than shorter, less expensive baby grand, upright, or spinet pianos.  Another reason is that long strings under high tension can store more acoustic energy than can short strings, giving larger instruments more loudness and better sustain than similar, smaller instruments.

See also 
 Electronic tuner
 Mel scale
 Octave band

References

External links
"Octave Types", BillBremmer.com.

Intervals (music)